Rushad Rana is an Indian actor and influencer. He is well known for his portrayals of Raghav in Hip Hip Hurray, Nikhil in Kehta Hai Dil, Sumit in Sasural Simar Ka, Coach Sir in Yeh Un Dinon Ki Baat Hai and Aniruddh Gandhi in Anupamaa. He also worked in the most hit Bollywood films Mohabbatein, Veer-Zaara, and Rab Ne Bana Di Jodi.

Personal life
Rana married Khushnum in 2010 but the couple divorced in 2013.

Rana met Ketaki Walawalkar on a dating app and later the couple became close friends on the sets of Anupamaa where Walawalkar served as a creative director. The couple dated for around one year and later married on 4 January 2023.

Filmography

Films

 2000 - Mohabbatein
 2000 - Motiya Baba
 2004 - Veer-Zaara
 2009 - Yeh Faasley
 2006 - Dor
 2010 - I Am
 2011 - Shirin Farhad Ki Toh Nikal Padi
 2008 - Rab Ne Bana Di Jodi
 2009 - 8 x 10 Tasveer
 2014 - The Xposé
 2015 - The Path of Zarathustra
 2015 - Bumper Draw
 2017 - Maatr
 2017 - Rangoon
 2018 - 3rd Eye
 2005 - Mr Ya Miss
 2008 - Superstar
 2017 - Aksar 2
 2005 - Sarkar
 2016 - Sanam Teri Kasam
 2013 - Gangoobai
 2015 - Calendar Girls
 2019 - Ekta
 2021 - Nail Polish

Television

 Kyunki Saas Bhi Kabhi Bahu Thi (guest appearance for an episode)
 Kasautii Zindagii Kay (2001-2002) as Aniruddh Basu (Anurag's cousin)
 Popcorn - Zoom TV (anchor)
 Manshaa
 Par Is Dil Ko Kaise Samjaye
 Hip Hip Hurray
 Woh Rehne Waali Mehlon Ki
 Balighat Ka Bargad
 India Calling
 Sanjog Se Bani Sangini
 Fear Files: Darr Ki Sacchi Tasvirein
 SuperCops vs Supervillains
 Savdhaan India
 Ajeeb Dastaan Hai Yeh
 Kismat
 Khotey Sikkay
 Bade Achhe Lagte Hain
 Kehta Hai Dil Jee Le Zara
 Itna Karo Na Mujhe Pyaar
 Code Red
 Kehta Hai Dil
 Shaka Laka Boom Boom
 Gulmohar Grand
 Kaisi Yeh Yaariyan
 Sasural Simar Ka
 Crime Patrol
 Agent Raghav – Crime Branch
 Yeh Un Dinon Ki Baat Hai
 Gumrah: End of Innocence
 Koi Laut Ke Aaya Hai
 Shakti - Astitva Ke Ehsaas Ki
 Kullfi Kumarr Bajewala
 Anupamaa
 Muskaan
 Kumkum Bhagya

Web series

Peshwar
Ilzaam
The Verdict – State vs Nanavati (2019)
The Raikar Case(2020)
Crashh (2021)

References

External links

Living people
Indian male television actors
Male actors in Hindi cinema
Male actors in Hindi television
Indian male film actors
1969 births
Parsi people